The soundtrack album of the fourth season of HBO series Game of Thrones, titled Game of Thrones: Season 4 was released digitally on June 10, 2014, and on CD on July 1, 2014. Season 4 of Game of Thrones saw the Icelandic band Sigur Rós perform their rendition of "The Rains of Castamere" in a cameo appearance at King Joffrey's wedding in the second episode, "The Lion and the Rose".

Reception
The soundtrack received mostly positive reviews from critics. The soundtrack was awarded a score of 4/5 by Heather Phares of AllMusic.

Track listing

Credits and personnel
Personnel adapted from the album liner notes.

 David Benioff – liner notes
 Ramin Djawadi – composer, primary artist, producer
 Sigur Rós – primary artist 
 George R.R. Martin – lyricist
 D.B. Weiss – liner notes

Charts

Awards and nominations

References

Ramin Djawadi soundtracks
2014 soundtrack albums
Soundtrack
Classical music soundtracks
Instrumental soundtracks
Television soundtracks
WaterTower Music soundtracks